Rena is a given name.

Notable people with this name 
Rena DeAngelo, American set decorator
Rena Effendi, Azerbaijani photographer
, Japanese voice actress, singer and idol
, Japanese singer and idol
Rena Kornreich Gelissen, writer and survivor of the Holocaust
Rena Kubota, Japanese female kickboxer
Rena Matsui, Japanese female idol
Rena Mero, American WWE professional wrestler, better known as Sable
Rena Sofer, American actress
Rena Takase, Japanese professional wrestler
Rena Takeda, Japanese actress
Rena Takeshita, Japanese fashion model / actress
Rena Vlahopoulou, Greek actress and singer
Rena (footballer), Portuguese footballer
Rena Nozawa, Japanese female idol,  former member of AKB48
Rena Kang, Korean female rapper from the idol group Pristin

Fictional characters
Cyberdoll Rena in Hand Maid May
Rena Kunisaki in the manga .hack//Legend of the Twilight
Rena Niimi, in the film Battle Royale II: Requiem
Rena Ryūgū in Higurashi no Naku Koro ni
Rena Sayers in anime series My-Otome
Rena Hirose in the video game Ace Combat 3: Electrosphere (Japanese version)
Rena Lanford in the video game Star Ocean: The Second Story
Rena Yanase in Ultraman Tiga

See also 
Rena (disambiguation)

Japanese feminine given names